The Jastro Building, also known as the Standard Oil Building, is a historic office building in Bakersfield, California.  The structure was placed on the National Register of Historic Places (NRHP) on September 22, 1983.

Structure
The Jastro Building a two-story structure in downtown Bakersfield, California.  Built in the late-Second Renaissance Revival architecture style, it was constructed in two sections in 1917 and 1921, the latter added a  wing.  The first floor is designed in a "C" shape, with an indentation at the rear of the building.  The second floor has an "H" shape design with an indented porch over the front, south-facing facade of the building; the main entrance is located on the first floor below the porch.  The structure has a flat roof with boxed cornice bracketed parapet.  The windows are vertical, 2-sash casement windows with transom.  The second story center porch windows have molded arches with frieze.

Significance
The Standard Oil Company entered the substantial oil industry in Kern County in 1902 to develop its holdings in the Kern River Oil Field.  With the construction of the Jastro Building, the company moved its Central California operations to Bakersfield.  At the time it was built, the building was the first commercial building in the downtown commercial district built across the city's G Street.  It is one of the finest examples of its type of architecture to survive the devastating 1952 Kern County earthquake relatively unscathed.

See also
Bakersfield Register of Historic Places and Areas of Historic Interest
California Historical Landmarks in Kern County, California
National Register of Historic Places listings in Kern County, California
Henry A. Jastro, Commodore of Kern County

References

Buildings and structures in Bakersfield, California
Office buildings completed in 1917
Commercial buildings on the National Register of Historic Places in California
National Register of Historic Places in Kern County, California